"Granite" is a song by Australian drum and bass band Pendulum, released as the first single from their second studio album In Silico. It was released through Warner Music UK, and through the band's new Eatstorm imprint with Warner Music Group. The song entered the UK Singles Chart on 11 November 2007, peaking at number 29 on 2 December. The single is supposedly inspired by the likes of video game boss battles, including the theme of various battles against the Mario series' Bowser; it directly samples the beginning of the music from the castle stages in Super Mario World. Q magazine named it 24th in the 50 top records of December 2007. When played in reverse, the main melody changes into the melody used in the end of the song, and vice versa. The song is featured in Need for Speed Undercover, and also an ATV game of Pure.

Music video
The music video is centred on the theme of ufology and aliens visiting Earth. The video features "amateur" video footage of various UFO sightings over cities and famous landmarks and monuments, as well as simulated news footage. Some of the UFOs resemble Pendulum's logo on their "In Silico" album and were later seen again in the music video for their other single "The Other Side". Locations include: Rome, Italy; Brussels, Belgium; Barcelona, Spain; Mexico City, Mexico; Paris, France; and London, England. In the last few images of the video a ghostly silhouette of an alien can be seen from an upstairs window.

Chart performance
"Granite" entered the UK Singles Chart on 11 November 2007 at number 48 based solely on downloads from iTunes and 7digital. Following the release of physical formats the song peaked at number 29 on 2 December, making it their second most successful original hit to date at the time – their remix of "Voodoo People" originally by The Prodigy having reached number twenty on 2 October 2005. This achievement was later surpassed by their next single "Propane Nightmares" which peaked in the charts at number nine. "Granite" remained in the chart for a total of six weeks.

Criticism
The track was criticised by veteran jungle and drum and bass producer, Goldie.

Track listing
These are the major formats and associated track listings of single releases of "Granite".

12-inch single

A. "Granite" – 4:26
B. "Granite"  – 4:20

CD single

"Granite" – 4:26
"Granite"  – 4:20

Limited edition 12-inch single

A. "Granite" – 4:26

Promo CD single

"Granite"  – 3:45
"Granite"  – 4:26

Personnel
The following people contributed to "Granite".
Rob Swire – vocals, synthesizer, mixing
Peredur ap Gwynedd – guitars
Paul Kodish – drums
Gareth McGrillen – bass guitar
Simon Askew – mixing
Dave Bascombe – mixing
John Davis – mastering

Charts

Release history

Notes

2007 singles
Songs written by Rob Swire
Pendulum (drum and bass band) songs
2007 songs
Warner Music Group singles